Lutman is an extinct town in Pettis County, in the U.S. state of Missouri.

A post office called Lutman was established in 1892, and remained in operation until 1907. The town has the name of George W. Lutman, the original owner of the site.

References

Ghost towns in Missouri
Former populated places in Pettis County, Missouri